Abadi Hadis (6 November 1997 – 4 February 2020) was an Ethiopian long-distance runner. He placed 15th over 10,000 metres at the 2016 Olympics.

He won a bronze medal at the 2017 IAAF World Cross Country Championships. He is one of just five men in history to have bettered 13 minutes for 5000m, 27 minutes for 10,000m and 59 minutes for the half marathon.

Hadis died in February 2020  at the age of 22 while being treated in a hospital for an unspecified illness.

References

External links

 

1997 births
2020 deaths
Ethiopian male long-distance runners
Olympic athletes of Ethiopia
Place of birth missing
Athletes (track and field) at the 2016 Summer Olympics
World Athletics Championships athletes for Ethiopia
Athletes (track and field) at the 2019 African Games
African Games competitors for Ethiopia
21st-century Ethiopian people